From the Heart is the third and final album by alt-rock/goth metal band Shadow Project, released in 1998 by Hollows Hill Records.

Production
After Shadow Project's first split in 1993, Rozz Williams and Eva O divorced (but remained friendly) and Williams' heroin addiction increased. In 1997 they would once again reunite to record From the Heart. Nathan Van Hala of christian metal group Saviour Machine was drafted to fill in the keyboard duties.

Musical style
Considered a departure from previous albums, From the Heart included band material from previous records stripped down to just acoustic guitar and vocal duets.

Themes
Released in 1994, Eva O's first solo debut shocked fans: she had converted to Christianity, and crafted a born-again concept album titled Demons Fall for an Angel's Kiss.

Track listing

Credits
Shadow Project
Rozz Williams – Vocals
Eva O – Vocals, Backing vocals and Acoustic guitar
Michael Ciravolo – Nylon string guitar, 12-String guitar and Bass guitar
Nathan Van Hala – Keyboards and Programming
Brian Virtue - Keyboards and Programming

Production
Michael Ciravolo – Producer, Mixer
Shadow Project - Producer
Michael Rozon - Assemblage
Mark Chalecki – Mastering
Lorin Crosby – Photography
Eva O - CD concept & Design

References

Shadow Project albums
1998 albums